Itzig may refer to:

 The Itzig family, famous for its contribution to Jewish and German cultural history
 Julius Eduard Hitzig, born Isaac Elias Itzig
 Itzig, Luxembourg (Hesperingen)

See also 
 Hitzig